The Trewartha climate classification (TCC) or the Köppen–Trewartha climate classification (KTC) is a climate classification system first published by American geographer Glenn Thomas Trewartha in 1966. It is a modified version of the Köppen–Geiger system, created to answer some of its deficiencies. The Trewartha system attempts to redefine the middle latitudes to be closer to vegetation zoning and genetic climate systems.

Scheme
Otherwise, the tropical climates and polar climates remained the same as the original Köppen climate classification.

The "highland" climate is ambiguously defined. Newer users of KTC generally omit this option.

Group A: Tropical climates
This is the tropical climate realm, defined the same as in Köppen's scheme (i.e., all 12 months average , or above). The "A" climates are the realm of the winterless frost-free zone. 

There was no specific monsoon climate identifier in the original scheme, but Am was added later, with the same parameters as Köppen's (except that at least three months, rather than one, must have less than 60 mm average precipitation).

Group B: Dry (arid and semi-arid) climates
BW and BS mean the same as in the Köppen scheme. However, a different formula is used to quantify the aridity threshold: 10(T − 10) + 3P, with T equaling the mean annual temperature in degrees Celsius and P denoting the percentage of total precipitation received in the six high-sun months (April through September in the Northern Hemisphere and October through March in the Southern). 

If the precipitation for a given location is less than the above formula, its climate is said to be that of a desert (BW); if it is equal to or greater than the above formula but less than twice that amount, the climate is classified as steppe (BS); and if the precipitation is more than double the value of the formula the climate is not in Group B. Unlike in Köppen's scheme, no thermal subsets exist within this group in Trewartha's, unless the Universal Thermal Scale (see below) is used.

Group C: Subtropical climates

There are only two types within the "C" or subtropical climate group,  Cs which is a dry -summer or Mediterranean climate, and a Cf or humid Subtropical climate. Cw types occur within the Cf group and mean subtropical Monsoon climates (like much of east Asia).

Group D: Temperate and continental climates

"D" climate groups have two types – an Oceanic type (Do), where the coldest month has a mean temperature  or higher, and a Continental type (Dc), where the coldest monthly mean temperature reaches below 0 °C in some interior landmasses like North America and Asia. 

For the continental climates (Dc), sometimes the third letter (a or b) is used to denote a hot or cold summer.

Most of Europe north of 44th parallel north exhibits Do or Dc climate types.

Group E: Boreal climates
In this climate zone there is only a short period (normally 50 to 90 days) that is frost free. In the original scheme, this group was not further divided; later, the designations Eo and Ec were created, with Eo (maritime subarctic) signifying that the coldest month averages above , while Ec (continental subarctic or "boreal") means that at least one month has an average temperature of −10 °C or below. As in Group D, a third letter can be added to indicate seasonality of precipitation. There is no separate counterpart to the Köppen Dfd, Dwd, and Dsd climate types in Trewartha's scheme, but a letter can optionally be added to the end of the symbol to indicate the temperature of the coldest month (see below).

Group F: Polar climates
This is the polar climate group, where all months must have a monthly mean air temperature of below . Polar climates have two subtypes Ft (tundra) and Fi (ice cap):

In the "Ft" climate type, at least one month has an average temperature above  (but not above ), so that there is a brief time when the surface might be free of snow or ice and a scrub or Tundra vegetation cover is possible.

In the "Fi" climate type, all months have an average temperature below , this is the region of the vast deserts of perpetually frozen Ocean in the North Pole, and the permanent ice plateaus of Antarctica and Greenland.

Group H: Highland climates
Highland climates are those in which altitude plays a role in determining climate classification.  Specifically, this would apply if correcting the average temperature of each month to a sea-level value using the formula of adding  for each  of elevation would result in the climate fitting into a different thermal group than that into which the actual monthly temperatures place it. 

The second letter used reflects the corrected monthly temperatures, not the actual monthly temperatures. G stands for glacier for instances.

Universal Thermal Scale
An option exists to include information on both the warmest and coldest months for every climate by adding a third and fourth letter respectively. The letters used conform to the following scale:
i — severely hot: Mean monthly temperature ≥ or higher
h — very hot: 
a — hot: 
b — warm: 
l — mild: 
k — cool: 
o — cold: 
c — very cold: 
d — severely cold: 
e — excessively cold:  or below.

Examples

A
 Awha for Surabaya, Indonesia
 Ambb for Mérida, Mérida, Venezuela
 Amhb for Miami, United States

B
 BWil for Riyadh, Saudi Arabia
 BWhl for Aswan, Egypt
 BSbc for Ulaanbaatar, Mongolia
 BSaa for Patos, Brazil
 BWho for Turpan, China
 BWih for Dallol, Ethiopia
 BSlk for Río Gallegos, Argentina

C
 Cfak for Tokyo
 Csll for San Francisco, California
 Cfhk for Dallas, U.S.
 Cwhl for Hanoi, Vietnam
 Cfbl for Melbourne, Australia
 Cfbk for Vigo, Spain
 Cflk for Nelson, New Zealand
 Cfal for Buenos Aires, Argentina
 Csal for Faro, Portugal

D
 Dobk for London, U.K.
 Dcao for Seoul, South Korea
 Dcbo for Klagenfurt, Austria
 Doak for New York City, United States
 Dclo for Cortina d'Ampezzo, Italy
E
 Ecle for Oymyakon, Russia
 Ecbd for Yakutsk, Russia
 Eolo for Tromsø, Norway
 Ecld for Norilsk, Russia
 Eclc for Karasjok, Norway
 Eolk for Punta Arenas, Chile
F
 Ftkd for Utqiagvik, Alaska, U.S.
 Ftkk for Ushuaia, Argentina
 Fide for Vostok Station in Antarctica.

See also
 Holdridge life zones climate classification by three dimensions: precipitation, humidity, and potential evapotranspiration ratio
 Koppen climate classification

References

External links
 Use of the Köppen–Trewartha climate classification for the People’s Republic of China

Climate and weather classification systems